Professor Eliezer Mbuki Feleshi is the current Attorney General of Tanzania and is the 10th Attorney General of Tanzania since the country's independence in 1961. He was appointed as the new Attorney General following the Suluhu Cabinet reshuffle in September 2021. Before being the Attorney General, Dr Feleshi was the principal judge of the High Court of Tanzania since 2018.

References

External links
 

Living people
21st-century Tanzanian judges
Attorneys General of Tanzania
Tanzanian MPs 2020–2025
1967 births